Nikolaus Katzer (born 12 October 1952) is a German historian and the director of the German Historical Institute Moscow.

Early life and education
Nikolaus Katzer was born in Marburg on 12 October 1952. From 1974 to 1978 he studied history and Russian studies at the Johann Wolfgang Goethe-University Frankfurt am Main. In 1978 he completed the first state exams and in 1984 the second state exams for the Gymnasiallehramt. In 1983 his doctorate was awarded.

Career
Katzer worked on a research project to the quadripartite meetings with the 1950s and was from 1987 to 1993 assistant professor at the Rheinische Friedrich-Wilhelms University of Bonn. In 1993 he was a fellow of the Deutsche Forschungsgemeinschaft. This was followed by research trips and archival research in London, Stanford, New York and Moscow. From 1994 to 1996 he worked as a teacher of history and Russian at Elizabeth High School in Frankfurt am Main. In 1996, he qualified as a professor. Since then, he has been professor of the history of the 19th and 20th centuries with special regard Central and Eastern Europe at the Helmut Schmidt University Hamburg. Since May 2010 he has been director of the German Historical Institute in Moscow. Since 2010 he has been a member of the joint commission for the exploration of the recent history of German-Russian relations.

His research interests include:
 War and Social Order, Civil War and Social Change (1812-1825, 1914-1921)
 Social and cultural history of the Brežnev era
 Science, technology and modernity in Russia
 Body culture and sport in Soviet civilization
 Literature and history

Selected publications
Die weisse Bewegung in Russland. Köln, Böhlau, 1999.

References 

1952 births
Living people
People from Marburg
20th-century German historians
German Historical Institutes
Historians of Russia
Academic staff of Helmut Schmidt University
21st-century German historians